The Tatra 15 is a classic railway automobile produced by Czech manufacturer Tatra. It was manufactured in the late 1940s and early 1950s.

15